Douglas Woo Chun-kuen JP (born 1978), is the chairman & managing director of Wheelock & Co. and managing director of its subsidiary Wheelock Properties and several other subsidiaries.

Wheelock is a former listed property group with its headquarters in Hong Kong.

Education
Woo was educated in Hong Kong and the United Kingdom before earning a bachelor's degree in architecture from Princeton University, US. In 2010, he was awarded a Master of Business Administration degree (EMBA Programme) by The Hong Kong University of Science & Technology Business School and The Kellogg School of Management of Northwestern University.

In 2016, he was awarded the honorary doctorate by Savannah College of Art and Design (Hong Kong).

Career
Woo worked in financial services and real estate prior to joining the Group in 2005. He was appointed a managing director of Wheelock in July 2013, and became chairman in January 2014.

References 

1978 births
Living people
Members of the Election Committee of Hong Kong, 2017–2021
Members of the Election Committee of Hong Kong, 2021–2026
Hong Kong real estate businesspeople